Tille may refer to:

 Tillé, village in northern France
 Tille (river), river in eastern France
 Tille Höyük, archaeological site in Turkey